Haydn Proctor (June 16, 1903 – October 2, 1996) was an American politician and judge who served as President of the New Jersey Senate and Associate Justice of the New Jersey Supreme Court.

Biography

Proctor was born in 1903 in the Ocean Grove section of Neptune Township, New Jersey. He attended Neptune High School, graduating in 1922, and Lafayette College, graduating in 1926. He went on to Yale Law School, where he was associate editor of the Yale Law Journal, earning his law degree in 1929. He served Monmouth County as a Republican member of the New Jersey General Assembly in 1936 and 1937. In 1937 he was appointed  Judge of the District Court of the First Judicial District of Monmouth County.

He was elected to the New Jersey Senate in 1938 and was reelected in 1941 and 1944. He was majority leader of the Senate in 1945 and Senate President in 1946, serving as Acting Governor in the absence of Governor Walter Evans Edge. Governor Edge nominated him to a vacancy on the Circuit Court in December 1946, and he was sworn in after the end of his Senate term in March 1947. He was a delegate to the New Jersey Constitutional convention of 1947. He became a Superior Court Judge in September 1948 and was reappointed by Governor Alfred E. Driscoll in 1953.

In August 1957, Governor Robert B. Meyner appointed Proctor to be an associate justice of the New Jersey Supreme Court. He was confirmed immediately by the State Senate and began serving in October 1957, after the retirement of Justice A. Dayton Oliphant. He was reappointed by Governor Richard J. Hughes in 1964. and served during the era known as the Weintraub Court.

In 1973, Proctor left the bench after reaching the mandatory retirement age of 70. He served on the Supreme Court's Committee on Opinions until he was 87. He died in 1996 at the age of 93 at a hospital near his home in Lakewood Township.

See also
List of justices of the Supreme Court of New Jersey

References

External links
Haydn Proctor at The Political Graveyard

1903 births
1996 deaths
People from Neptune Township, New Jersey
Neptune High School alumni
Lafayette College alumni
Yale Law School alumni
Republican Party members of the New Jersey General Assembly
Republican Party New Jersey state senators
Presidents of the New Jersey Senate
New Jersey state court judges
Justices of the Supreme Court of New Jersey
20th-century American lawyers
20th-century American judges
20th-century American politicians